Robert Devereux, 16th Viscount Hereford (3 January 1843 – 27 March 1930) was an English Peer. The Viscountcy of Hereford is the oldest extant viscountcy in the Peerage of England, making the holder the Premier Viscount of England.

Life
Lord Hereford was the eldest son of the Rev. Canon Robert Devereux, 15th Viscount Hereford. He was educated at Eton and Sandhurst. He was a JP and DL for Breconshire, a JP for Herefordshire and Radnorshire, and a county alderman for Monmouthshire.

Family
On 16 July 1863 he married the Hon. Mary Anne Morgan, youngest daughter of Charles Morgan, 1st Baron Tredegar. They had six children.

Hon Robert Charles Devereux, later 17th Viscount Hereford
Hon Muriel Devereux (b. 11 Aug 1866; d. 5 Jul 1924), mar. 2 May 1893 Anthony Noel Denny, of La Chripa, Puerto Oratava, Tenerife
Hon Eleanor Mary Devereux (b. 20 Sep 1868; d. 22 Jun 1944), mar. 21 Aug 1906 Maj Albert Addams-Williams OBE
Hon Lilian Devereux (b. 4 Sep 1870; d. 17 Oct 1959)
Hon Sybil Devereux (b. 19 Jan 1873; d. 3 Mar 1892)
Hon Rosamond Ela Devereux (b. 23 Jul 1875; d. 3 Aug 1945)

Lord Hereford died in 1930 shortly after becoming Father of the House of Lords having been a peer for 74 years and seven months.

Arms

References

Book cited

External links
A listing of the Devereux family

1843 births
1930 deaths
Robert 16
Robert
People educated at Eton College